Kovacs Glacier is a glacier on the southeast side of Lexington Table, flowing east-northeast into Support Force Glacier in the Forrestal Range of the Pensacola Mountains, Antarctica. It was named by the Advisory Committee on Antarctic Names in 1979 after Austin Kovacs, who was leader of the 1973–74 United States Antarctic Research Program – Cold Regions Research and Engineering Laboratory survey party (with G. Erlanger and G. Abele) in this area, and also worked in the McMurdo Sound area.

See also
 List of glaciers in the Antarctic
 Glaciology

References

 

Glaciers of Queen Elizabeth Land